Peter Paul Gomez was a Member of Parliament of Pakistan representing East Bengal.

References

Pakistani MNAs 1955–1958